The Immediate Geographic Region of Piumhi is one of the 10 immediate geographic regions in the Intermediate Geographic Region of Varginha, one of the 70 immediate geographic regions in the Brazilian state of Minas Gerais and one of the 509 of Brazil, created by the National Institute of Geography and Statistics (IBGE) in 2017.

Municipalities 
It comprises 5 municipalities.

 Capitólio      
 Doresópolis      
 Piumhi      
 São Roque de Minas      
 Vargem Bonita

References 

Geography of Minas Gerais